The Roman Catholic Diocese of Santa Elena is a diocese located in the town of Santa Elena in the Ecclesiastical province of Guayaquil in Ecuador.

Diocese
The diocese covers an area of the 3 cantons in the Santa Elena Province: Santa Elena, La Libertad, Salinas and also the territories, that belong to the Guayas Province: Playas Canton and the localities El Morro, Posorja and Progreso. 

It's divided into 28 parishes and has 29 diocesan and 14 religious priests as per 2022.

History
On 2 February 2022, Pope Francis established the Diocese of Santa Helena, when it was split off from the Roman Catholic Archdiocese of Guayaquil.

Ordinaries
Guido Iván Minda Chalá (since 2 February 2022)

See also
Roman Catholicism in Ecuador

References

External links
 Profile at the Catholic Hierarchy

Roman Catholic dioceses in Ecuador
Roman Catholic Ecclesiastical Province of Guayaquil
Christian organizations established in 2022
Roman Catholic dioceses and prelatures established in the 21st century
2022 establishments in Ecuador